Walid Tayaa (born 12 July 1976) is a Tunisian film director.

Career 
He studied sociology and then started to make films. He directed a few amateur short films, before realizing his first professional short film Madame Bahja in 2006, which was screened at the Cannes Film Festival. Afterwards, he participated in writing workshops with the French film director Ève Deboise and released more short films. His short film El Icha won the Grand Prize at the Festival du Cinéma Méditerranéen de Tétouan.

The short film Boulitik in 2011 depicted different moments of the Tunisian Revolution and deals with LGBT rights in Tunisia. He was one of the few people who supported the foundation of the LGBT organisation Association Shams in 2015 in public.

In 2013 he shot a documentary about the Tunisian feminist Dorra Bouzid. Fataria in 2017 was his first feature film.

Filmography 

 2006: Madame Bahja
 2009: El Icha (Vivre)
 2010: Ena el Issaoui
 2010: Prestige
 2011: Boulitik
 2012: Journal d'un citoyen ordinnaire
 2013: Dora Bouzid, première  journaliste  tunisienne,  une  femme  un combat
 2014: El Kef
 2015: Café Sidi amara Halfaouine
 2016: Embouteillage
 2017: Fataria

References

External links 
 

1976 births
Tunisian film directors
Living people
People from Tunis